María Lionza is a large statue depicting the titular goddess, María Lionza, riding a tapir. It is located between lanes of the Francisco Fajardo freeway next to the University City campus of the Central University of Venezuela, in Caracas. The original, which is currently located in a university warehouse, was created by Alejandro Colina in 1951 to sit outside the stadium for that year's Bolivarian Games. In its place on the highway is a cast made by Silvestre Chacón in 2004; the replacement has received negative reactions, and its construction damaged the original.

Colina often depicted indigenous figures like María Lionza, and it is said to be his most famous sculpture. In the statue, the goddess is shown nude, which is unusual for representations of her. Nevertheless, the statue, and versions of it, are worshiped by her followers.

Background

The statue is of Venezuelan goddess María Lionza, a cult figure and nature goddess from Yaracuy; the artist, Alejandro Colina, made many sculptures based on indigenous folklore. In the 1920s he spent eight years living in some of western Venezuela's indigenous communities, and later chose to depict related iconography in his monumental sculptures. According to Venezuelan folklorist Gilberto Antolínez, in the 1940s Colina was also involved in a movement to mythologize María Lionza. Antolínez recalled: "In 1939 we created a social movement aimed at extolling the ancestral values of Venezuela. I myself, the sculptor Alejandro Colina, and the architect Hermes Romero joined together in a group [...] We organized a series of conferences and popularizing events and [...] used such occasions to 'mythologize' María Lionza, both in her legend and in the sculpture that nowadays stands on the main Caracas highway".

Social anthropologist Roger Canals, who directed the 2016 film A goddess in motion: María Lionza in Barcelona, noted that in the religious cult of María Lionza, idols were not traditionally used, with most worship occurring in natural spots up to the early 20th century. María Lionza's followers grew in number the 1950s, and so depictions of her increased. Though the depictions of her in rituals and on altars vary, the most common are either that of her face, showing a fair-skinned mestizo queen, or an image based on Colina's statue, depicting an indigenous Venezuelan.

Construction and location

Olympic Stadium

The monumental statue was originally made to sit outside the Central University of Venezuela (UCV)'s Olympic Stadium for the 1951 Bolivarian Games; during the Bolivarian Games, the Olympic flame was held in the pelvis at the top of the statue. There is another monumental statue, Francisco Narváez' El Atleta, that is also located by the Olympic Stadium and was made in 1951. Unlike the other works of art at the university, which were part of the modernist Synthesis of the Arts movement under the design of architect Carlos Raúl Villanueva, the statue of María Lionza was commissioned by the dictator Marcos Pérez Jiménez, who wanted to make her a symbol of Venezuela.

Francisco Fajardo freeway

In the years after the Bolivarian Games, with the expansion of the city, the road system was made larger and the new Francisco Fajardo freeway passed closely around the campus near the stadium. In 1953 the statue was moved a short distance to its prominent location on the highway. The university had been asking for it to be removed, aware of the growing cult status of María Lionza and fearing that rituals would begin to be performed by her followers on campus grounds. Pérez Jiménez shared the concern: though he had elevated her to a national symbol, his dictatorship followed the Catholic Church and heavily persecuted other belief systems under a law enacted against paganism. As he did not want the symbol of María Lionza to become an icon of a religious cult, he ordered the statue to be moved to what was believed to be an inaccessible and dangerous location, between lanes in the center divide of the busy highway. The Guardian reported in 2019 that while the Catholic Church of Venezuela still disapproves of the indigenous religion, it "has long since abandoned its attempts to suppress it".

Though located just outside of the university, the statue is generally seen as part of the campus environs. It is under the authority of the university, and is protected as part of the campus World Heritage Site.

Sorte mountain 
On 3 October 2022, the UCV reported that the statue had gone missing, denouncing publicly its subtraction with the Anti-Theft Division of the Scientific, Criminal and Criminalistic Investigation Service Corps (CICPC) forensic police. The Institute of Cultural Heritage (IPC) took responsibility for the controversial relocation, which took place the day before on 2 October. The agency's authorities declared that the decision was made to "protect, preserve and relocate the statue in new conditions in accordance with its historical, patrimonial and spiritual significance" and accused the university of having "kidnapped" the sculture. The Venezuelan Federation of Spiritism announced that the statue would be placed near the Sorte Mountain, where another replica was already located. On 4 October the statue was received in Yaracuy amidst drums and songs dedicated to the goddess.

Appearance

The statue depicts the indigenous Venezuelan fertility goddess María Lionza nude and holding a woman's pelvis in both hands high above her head while riding astride a tapir that stands on a snake. The faux stone statue stands at 5.9 × 1.2 × 3.74 metres (19' 4.25" × 3' 11.25" × 12' 3.25"), excluding the pedestal. Followers of María Lionza believe that Colina did not artistically create the image of the goddess on the tapir for the statue, but that he "had a vision" of her in this position and, "during the vision, the goddess gave him the mission of creating a statue reproducing her appearance".

The Chicana/o studies professor and ethnologist Maria Herrera-Sobek explains that the statue draws on the 'Yara' identity of the goddess (who is known by different names with different stories), representing fertility. Discussing the iconography of the statue, she wrote that the depiction in nude and riding the tapir "represents female strength and courage, the essence of a woman warrior".

Canals wrote that other depictions of María Lionza, those used in public rituals and often made from mannequins, are typically fully clothed and are given much make-up and careful hair styling. He said that these clothed depictions are designed to emphasize María Lionza's sexuality and make her look like a fairy tale princess, contrasting them with Colina's statue. According to him, the statue is more sensual and erotic than the depictions of María Lionza as the mestizo queen, due to the nudity, and deliberately contrasts the feminine María Lionza with the masculine represented by the tapir, but still shows "a woman with a serious face, an athletic body with powerful legs and strong arms".

Replacement
The work is protected by the university's artwork commission for the University City of Caracas campus World Heritage Site. In 2004, a replica was commissioned by the council of the City of Caracas so that the original statue could be protected. The replica was made by Silvestre Chacón. However, during the process of casting the replica, the original was significantly damaged; it has since been repaired by restorer Fernando de Tovar, who described the replica as "ridiculous". Despite the repair and calls to put the original back on display, it is still kept locked in a workshop at UCV. The Institutional Assets and Monuments of Venezuela project wrote that objections to the replacement suggest that because the original statue is the one that holds heritage value, it is the one that the public should be able to appreciate. Followers of María Lionza also debate the benefits of returning the statue to its original location on the campus; some members of the university and the government would instead like to move the statue further away from the city center. Another replica was installed at Chivacoa, near Sorte mountain, a spiritual home of the religion, in 2006.

Legacy

The statue quickly became an icon of Caracas, impressing both the elite of the city and its artistic circles, as well as María Lionza's followers. The followers began leaving tributes at the statue in the 1960s, and many copies are made in miniature to be placed on altars. Even as a replica, it is still given many tributes: in 2012, Herrera-Sobek wrote that "no day passes without lit candles and flowers appearing at the bottom of the sculpture", though it is dangerous to place them there due to the busy highway.

In discussion of the miniature replicas created by María Lionza's followers, Canals said that these idols are less detailed but also more erotic, which he explained is part of a process of goddess sexualization (done by exaggerating typically feminine features) seen in many religious cults. Clothes are also put on them in some instances out of respect for the divine, though Canals writes that this explicitly acknowledges the sexual nature by shrouding it.

In popular culture, the statue has been the inspiration for works of literature. In the 1990s, the statue was used as the cover for a series of poetry collections called The Goddess, with each edition containing a dedication to María Lionza and "her metaphor – a queen, naked, exuberant, who roams the countryside mounted on a tapir". The statue also forms a major symbolic plot point in the 2009 Margaret Mascarenhas novel The Disappearance of Irene Dos Santos.

In 2001, it was the inspiration for distinguished poet Yolanda Pantin's poem "The pelvic bone"; in the poem, the narrator travels into Caracas for a protest and sees the statue. The image of the pelvis – its "most notable feature" – stays in the narrator's mind, and the poem goes on to address the statue directly. In their book, Venezuela experts David Smilde and Daniel Hellinger write that, in Pantin's poem, the statue is seen to represent María Lionza as the mother of the nation, and the pelvis represents its symbolic birth. They also note that the narrator is a non-believer in terms of María Lionza, but is still drawn in by the statue and refers to it with familiarity, as well as speaking collectively, suggesting that all Venezuelans see her as their goddess and a symbol of hope in a broken nation. This imagery is reiterated later in the poem with a ray of light shining through the pelvis onto the protesters.

See also
List of artworks in University City of Caracas

References

External links
 

1951 sculptures
Animal sculptures
Ciudad Universitaria de Caracas
Colossal statues
Nude sculptures
Outdoor sculptures in Venezuela
Sculptures of goddesses
Sculptures of women
Snakes in art
Statues in Venezuela